Acetyl hexapeptide-3 or acetyl hexapeptide-8 (sources differ) is a synthetic anti-wrinkle cosmetics ingredient. It is a peptide which is a fragment of SNAP-25, a substrate of botulinum toxin (Botox). Acetyl hexapeptide-8 is marketed as Argireline by the Barcelona-based research laboratory Lipotec.

Overview and common uses
Acetyl hexapeptide-3 is used in attempts to decrease the visible effects of aging by reducing the deep wrinkles and lines that occur around the forehead and eyes.

Chemically, when applied as a solution to specific areas of the face, acetyl hexapeptide-3 inhibits the reactions that cause muscles to move or contract – for example when forming facial expressions such as smiling or frowning.

Studies
Both in vitro (outside a living organism) and in vivo (using a living organism) tests have been carried out, but no double-blind anti-wrinkle studies are available.

In a 2012 double-blind, placebo-controlled trial investigating treatment of blepharospasm (abnormal contraction or twitch of the eyelid), botulinum toxin injections with subsequent acetyl hexapeptide-3 treatment were compared to botulinum toxin injections with placebo cream treatment. Of the 12 patients in the acetyl hexapeptide-3 group, four experienced an extension of symptom control by 3.3 to 7.1 months.

Safety research
The 2012 study concluded there were no significant adverse effects. Patients receiving botulinum toxin injections exhibited longer times until return to baseline symptoms when supported with daily application of acetyl hexapeptide-8.

Chemistry
Acetyl hexapeptide-3 is the hexapeptide with the sequence Ac-Glu-Glu-Met-Gln-Arg-Arg-NH2.

References

Hexapeptides
Cosmetics chemicals